The banded linsang (Prionodon linsang) is a linsang, a tree-dwelling carnivorous mammal native to the Sundaic region of Southeast Asia.

Description
It is a pale yellow with five dark bands. The average weight is around 700 g. It has broad stripes on its neck and its tail consists of several dark bands with a dark tip. The tail has seven or eight dark bands and ends in a dark tip. The banded linsang has very sharp retractable claws.

Distribution and habitat
The banded linsang has been recorded in southern Myanmar, Thailand, Peninsular Malaysia, and the Sunda Islands of Borneo, Sumatra, Java, Bangka and Belitung Islands. It lives in evergreen forests. In Thailand and Malaysia it has been recorded in deciduous forest, and in Sarawak also in secondary forest and close to oil palm plantations.

In 2013, a banded linsang was recorded for the first time by a camera-trap in the hill forests of Karen State.

Ecology and behaviour
The banded linsang is nocturnal and usually solitary. It is carnivorous, with its diet consisting of small vertebrates, such as birds, rats, and snakes.

Very little is known about the banded linsang's reproduction. It is thought that litters of 2–3 are born semiannually in a nest in burrows or hollow trees.

Taxonomy
Until recently the two species of Asiatic linsangs were considered to be members of the family Viverridae and to be related to the morphologically similar genets. However, recent genetic taxonomy investigations have strongly suggested that the Asiatic linsangs are a sister-group of the cat family, Felidae. It has been proposed that the Asiatic linsangs be placed in the monogeneric family Prionodontidae.

References

External links

Viverrids
Mammals of Indonesia
Carnivorans of Malaysia
Mammals of Thailand
Fauna of Sumatra
Mammals of Borneo
Mammals described in 1821